"Feels Like Today" is a song written by Wayne Hector and Steve Robson and recorded by American country music group Rascal Flatts.  It was released in June 2004 as the first single and title track from the album Feels Like Today. The song peaked at number 9 on the U.S. Billboard Hot Country Singles & Tracks chart in 2004.

"Feels Like Today" was featured on the Smallville: The Metropolis Mix soundtrack. It was played during the Season 4 episode, "Run."

Music video
The music video was directed by Deaton-Flanigen and premiered in August 2004. It was filmed in Asbury Park, NJ. It features the trio performing the song on the boardwalk, outside the Monmouth County Prison, and inside Boardwalk Hall accompanied by a string section. In between these scenes, shots of a photographer dressed in all black and a top hat is seen delivering pictures to several depressed people on the dried up, empty boardwalk. At the end of the video, the people open the photo envelopes, and see photos of them with their families, instantly cheering them up. The photographer then simply walks away.

The video won Group/Duo Video of the Year at the 2005 CMT Music Awards.

Chart performance

Year-end charts

References

2004 singles
Rascal Flatts songs
Songs written by Wayne Hector
Songs written by Steve Robson
Lyric Street Records singles
Country ballads
Music videos directed by Deaton-Flanigen Productions
Song recordings produced by Mark Bright (record producer)
2004 songs